Zhang Chiming (born 7 January 1989) is a Chinese professional footballer who is currently a free agent.

Club career
Zhang Chiming started his football career when he received training with Chengdu Youth where he was considered good enough to join Ligue 1 side FC Metz for further training in 2004. On 29 September 2004, after the French training camp had ended, Zhang was recommended to train with Premier League side Everton by one of their players Li Tie. On 3 January 2005, English Championship side Sheffield United became interested in Zhang and officially signed him to their youth academy. He would struggle to receive any playing time because he wasn't granted a work permit; however, on 11 December 2005, the club officially took over China League One side Chengdu Blades and Zhang was incorporated into the squad. At Chengdu, Zhang played for their youth academy and was eventually promoted to the first team. Primeira Liga side FC Porto also became interested in Zhang who eventually signed for a two-year deal on 17 August 2007 after a drawn out transfer that required international clearance.

At FC Porto, Zhang was unable to be promoted to the club's first team and was free to leave the club once his contract expired. He then had a trial with 2. Bundesliga side FC Augsburg on 23 August 2008 which was followed by another trial with Austrian Bundesliga side LASK Linz on 9 January 2009. Zhang would eventually find a club with Austrian Regional League side SV Horn who he joined on 20 February 2009. He made his debut for the club on 27 March 2009 in a 0-0 draw against SV Mattersburg II, coming on as a substitute. In the 2008-09 season, he played nine games as the club finished second within the third tier; however, he only played four games in the following season and was allowed to leave the club.

Zhang then decided to join China League One side Chongqing Lifan on 22 February 2011. He made his debut for the club on 27 March 2011 in 1-1 draw against Beijing Baxy. This was followed by his first goal for the club, also against Beijing, on 4 May 2011 in a 3-0 win in the 2011 Chinese FA Cup.

On 10 July 2015, Zhang transferred to fellow Chinese Super League side Beijing Guoan. He made his debut for the club on 20 July 2015 in a 0-0 draw against Shanghai SIPG.

On 15 June 2018, Zhang transferred to Tianjin TEDA.

International career
Zhang made his debut for the Chinese national team on 27 March 2015 in a 2-2 draw against Haiti.

Career statistics
Statistics accurate as of match played 31 December 2020.

Honours

Club
Chongqing Lifan
China League One: 2014

References

External links
 
 
SV Horn

1989 births
Living people
Sportspeople from Chengdu
Chinese footballers
Footballers from Sichuan
Chinese expatriate footballers
Chengdu Tiancheng F.C. players
Chongqing Liangjiang Athletic F.C. players
Beijing Guoan F.C. players
Tianjin Jinmen Tiger F.C. players
Chinese Super League players
China League One players
China international footballers
Expatriate footballers in Austria
SV Horn players
Association football wingers
Austrian Regionalliga players